Master of the Art is a live album led by trumpeter Woody Shaw which was recorded in New York City on 25 February 1982 at the Jazz Forum and released on the Elektra/Musician label.  Shaw's subsequent album, Night Music, was recorded at the same appearance and date.

Reception

Michael G. Nastos of Allmusic stated, "Master of the Art is another example of how Woody Shaw was at the top of his game before he died... and why he was revered as a force to be reckoned with".

Track listing 
All compositions by Woody Shaw except as indicated
 "400 Years Ago Tomorrow" (Walter Davis, Jr.) - 10:22
 "Diane" (Lew Pollack, Erno Rapee) - 10:27
 "Misterioso" (Thelonious Monk) - 17:16
 "Sweet Love of Mine" - 9:41
 The Woody Shaw Interview - 2:40

Personnel 
Woody Shaw - trumpet, flugelhorn
Bobby Hutcherson - vibraphone 
Steve Turre - trombone
Mulgrew Miller - piano 
Stafford James - bass
Tony Reedus - drums

Chart performance

References 

Woody Shaw live albums
1982 live albums
Elektra/Musician live albums
Albums produced by Michael Cuscuna